Raja  (Urdu) is a village of Gujranwala District located in Punjab, Pakistan

History

Mosques
Jamia Masjid Sadiqia Rizvia (Hanfi Bareelvi Bary Manaar Wali) 
Jamia Masjid Ahlehadees (Ahlehadees) 
Jamia Masjid Madni (Hanfi Dewbandi) 
Masjid Alhayat (Hanfi Dewbandi) 
Jamia Masjid Toheed (Toheedi Sect) 
Imam Bargah Husania Masjid (Fikkah Jafria)

Schools and education
SP High School 
Govt. Primary School for Girls 
Govt. High School for boys 
Govt. Primary School for Boys 
Sir Sayed Model School

Banks 
MCB Bank Limited (Raja Sadhoke Branch),

Agriculture 
Rice and wheat are the basic crops cultivated in the area

Hospitals 
Basic Health Unit Raja.

Transportation 
Main High Way is N-5 Grand Trunk Road passing through sadhoke which is connected by Baig Pur Road and Canal Road. 
Baig Pur Road passing through many small villages ends at Baig Pur Village situated on Gujranwala Sheikhupura Road. 
No train station in located in Raja, the nearest train station is Sadhoke Train Station, where a few local trains stops for a while.

Telecommunications 
PTCL   = PSTN and DSL (Copper line, No Optic Fiber) 
JAZZ   = Cellular with 4G LTE indoor Services  
Telenor = Cellular with 4G Services  
Zong     = Cellular with 4G Services  
Ufone = Cellular with 4G Services  
PTCL EVO  = Charji EVO

Climate
Weather conditions for Raja Village are dominated by its geographical location.

The summer season is long and hot.

Geography

Nearby locations
Sadhoke 1 km east side 
Muridke 13 km South via Sadhoke
kamoke 10 km North via Sadhoke 
Sheikhupura 30 km West via Baig pur road
Gujranwala  30 km North via sadhoke
Lahore 35 km South via Sadhoke

Major tribes
Malik, Syed, Rajputs and Jats are major tribe. The principal clans are Virk Gill Rajput Mughal Khokhar Ansari Kumar Arain Mochi Minhas Bhatti Qureshi Julah Chowkidar Bajwa and a small Christian community also residing here.

References

Gujranwala District